Amleang is the largest town in Thpong District of Kampong Speu Province, Cambodia. In 1998, its population was 8,215. The Communist Party of Kampuchea once had their headquarters and a liaison committee based in Amleang.

References

Towns in Cambodia
Populated places in Kampong Speu province